Gabriele Giordano Caccia (born 24 February 1958) is an Italian prelate of the Catholic Church who works in the diplomatic service of the Holy See. He has worked in the offices of the Secretariat of State and served as Apostolic Nuncio in Lebanon and the Philippines. He was named Permanent Observer of the Holy See to the United Nations in 2019.

Biography
Caccia was born in Milan but lived for many years in Cavaria con Premezzo. He was ordained a priest on 11 June 1983 by Cardinal Carlo Maria Martini and served in St. Giovanni Bosco parish in Milan until 1986. He attended the Pontifical Ecclesiastical Academy and obtained a Doctorate in Sacred Theology (S.T.D.) and a Licentiate of Canon Law (J.C.L.) from the Pontifical Gregorian University. He joined the diplomatic service of the Holy See on 1 July 1991 and was appointed an attaché in the Apostolic Nunciature in Tanzania.

On 11 June 1993, he returned to Rome to work in the General Affairs Section of the Vatican Secretariat of State. On 17 December 2002 he was appointed Assessor for General Affairs of the Secretariat of State where he worked under Archbishop Leonardo Sandri and, after 2007, Archbishop Fernando Filoni.

On 16 July 2009, Pope Benedict XVI appointed him Apostolic Nuncio in Lebanon and Titular Archbishop of Sepino. He was consecrated by the Pope on 12 September 2009, with Cardinals Tarcisio Bertone and William Levada as co-consecrators. On 12 September 2017, Pope Francis appointed him as Apostolic Nuncio in the Philippines.

On 16 November 2019, Pope Francis named him the Holy See's permanent observer to the United Nations. He was officially given the duties of that position on 16 January 2020.

Foreign honours
:
 Grand Cross (Datu) of the Order of Sikatuna (GrCS) (11 December 2019)

See also
 List of heads of the diplomatic missions of the Holy See

References

External links

1958 births
Living people
Pontifical Ecclesiastical Academy alumni
Pontifical Gregorian University alumni
21st-century Italian Roman Catholic titular archbishops
Diplomats from Milan
Commanders Crosses of the Order of Merit of the Federal Republic of Germany
Knights Grand Cross of the Order of Merit of the Italian Republic
Apostolic Nuncios to Lebanon
Apostolic Nuncios to the Philippines
Permanent Observers of the Holy See to the United Nations
Clergy from Milan